Toyin Ajoke Muyinat Lawani-Adebayo popularly known as Toyin Lawani is one of Nigeria’s Ace Celebrity Fashion Mogul, Author, Philanthropist and Serial Entrepreneur who runs  33 businesses under her wing at TIANNAHSPLACEMPIRE.

Tiannah's Empire, a reality television show that focused on her life was produced and distributed by EbonyLife Studio.
She featured in the TV show, The Real Housewives of Lagos released on Showmax in 2022.

Personal life 
Toyin was born on the 1st of March 1982

She is an astute self-taught Fashion Stylist and Designer. Known for her trendsetting, controversial, and bringing unconventional Rebellion to fashion through her superlative flair for fantastic creative ideas. 

The Unstoppable multiple talented Toyin Lawani's became one of the most sort after African Fashion Designers  after showcasing her collections which lit up the runway at Africa Fashion Week London in 2013.

She subsequently showcased her collections at the Africa Fashion Week Nigeria and featured as a judge at the Nigeria’s Next Top Designer Reality series. She is also the Youth Ambassador for Fashion Designers Association of Nigeria(FADAN).

In an interview with Chude Jideonwo, Toyin Lawani revealed that she was raped by her uncle at 15. In 2022, she announced the loss of her fourth pregnancy.

Filmography 
The Real Housewives of Lagos.

Award

References 

Nigerian fashion designers
Living people
Year of birth missing (living people)